Casamancian Autonomous Movement (in French: Mouvement Autonome Casamançais) was a political party in Casamance, southern Senegal. MAC was led by Assane Seck.

MAC was initially linked to French Section of the Workers' International (SFIO), but later merged with the Senegalese Popular Bloc.
Socialist parties in Senegal
Casamance